Bayaning 3rd World is a 1999 Philippine mockumentary film directed by Mike de Leon and written by De Leon and Clodualdo del Mundo Jr. It examines the heroism of Philippine national hero Jose Rizal, particularly on his supposed retraction of his writings against the Catholic Church in the Philippines during the Spanish colonization period in the country.

Plot
Two filmmakers try to create a film venturing on the life of José Rizal. Before they do that, they try to investigate on the heroism of the Philippine national hero. Of particular focus is his supposed retraction of his views against the Roman Catholic Church during the Spanish regime in the Philippines which he expressed primarily through his two novels Noli Me Tangere and El Filibusterismo.

The investigation was done mainly by "interviewing" key individuals in the life of Rizal such as his mother Teodora Alonso, his siblings Paciano, Trinidad, and Narcisa, his love interest and supposed wife Josephine Bracken, and the Jesuit priest who supposedly witnessed Rizal's retraction, Vicente Balaguer. Eventually, the two filmmakers would end up "interviewing" Rizal himself to get to the bottom of the issue.

Production
In 1997, director Mike de Leon had been working on a film project on the life of Jose Rizal with Cinemax Studios. Along the way, he invited screenwriter Clodualdo del Mundo Jr. to collaborate with him in the project. Problems during production eventually led to the project being scrapped, though it would later be completed by director Marilou Diaz-Abaya as the 1998 film Jose Rizal.

Despite this, de Leon and Del Mundo decided to proceed with producing an independently financed film on Jose Rizal. The duo tried to conceptualize on a film different from that of the original film project they worked on. De Leon created his first draft of the script in the English language, while Del Mundo would translate the script in the Filipino language and add some revisions.

Cast
 Ricky Davao as Filmmaker # 1
 Cris Villanueva as Filmmaker # 2
 Joel Torre as José Rizal
 Daria Ramirez as Teodora Alonzo
 Joonee Gamboa as Paciano
 Rio Locsin as Trinidad
 Cherry Pie Picache as Narcisa
 Lara Fabregas as Josephine Bracken
 Ed Rocha as Vicente Balaguer
 Bon Vivar as José Villaclara

Release

Reception

Film rating
The film had been rated "A" by the Film Ratings Board in 1999. Members of the FRB who viewed the pre-release screening on November 9, 1999, noted that the film brought hope that the local film industry will still be able to excel as the new millennium unfolded.

Critical response
The film has been critically praised for its unique depiction on the life of Jose Rizal. Those who viewed the film at the FRB pre-release screening noted that the film managed to make a difficult subject "accessible, comprehensible and even exciting" and presented itself in a manner that the younger audience could relate to. Film critic Nestor Torre views the film as an "artistic triumph" and believes that it would generate discussion among its viewers on Rizal's status as a hero.

In 2004, the New York-based film magazine Film Comments included the film in its list of 10 Best Films in Alternative Cinema.

Despite receiving critical acclaim, it was not able to earn well financially when it was first released to Philippine theaters in a limited run. It was re-released in 2000, but was soon pulled due to its poor performance.

Accolades
The film won six of 13 awards at the 23rd Gawad Urian in 2000, namely Best Picture, Best Director, Best Supporting Actor (Joel Torre), Best Cinematography, Best Sound, and Best Music. Aside from these, it was also nominated for Best Screenplay, Best Actor (Cris Villanueva), Best Supporting Actor (Ed Rocha), Best Production, and Best Editing.

The film also got three nominations from the Film Academy of the Philippines, namely Best Picture, Best Supporting Actress (Daria Ramirez), and Best Editor.

See also
Rizal sa Dapitan - 1997 Filipino film about Jose Rizal's exile in Dapitan
Jose Rizal - 1998 Filipino film on the life of Jose Rizal

References

External links

 Bayaning 3rd World at the Manunuri ng Pelikulang Pilipino
 Bayaning 3rd World at The New York Times

1999 films
Cultural depictions of José Rizal
José Rizal
1990s mockumentary films
Philippine black-and-white films
Philippine documentary films
Philippine satirical films
1990s Tagalog-language films
Films directed by Mike De Leon